John Landis Mason (1832 in Vineland, New Jersey – February 26, 1902) was an American tinsmith and the patentee of the metal screw-on lid for antique fruit jars that have come to be known as Mason jars. Many such jars were printed with the line "Mason's Patent Nov 30th 1858". He also invented the first screw top salt shaker in 1858.

Inventing career
In 1858, he invented a square-shouldered jar with threaded screw-top, matching lid, and rubber ring for an airtight seal – the Mason jar. Until the 1830s, long before refrigeration and hothouse gardens, many fruits and vegetables had been available only seasonally, but the recent development of jars had made canning a practical alternative to drying, pickling, or smoking to preserve food.

Prior to Mason's innovation, jars had a flat, un-threaded top, across which a tin flat lid was laid and sealed with wax. It was messy, unreliable, and unsafe – if the wax was not applied properly it allowed bacteria to thrive in the jar.

Mason's easy and re-usable jars made home canning procedures popular among American settlers, homesteaders, and even in urban homes, but most Mason jars were manufactured by competitors after his patent expired in 1879.

Personal life
He was married and had nine daughters, six surviving to adulthood. He died in poverty in a tenement house in New York City in 1902.

Patents

United States patent 22,186, dated November 30, 1858, is primarily on the use of exterior threads in the jar and a corresponding metal cap. Later patents such as Nr.102,913 improved upon this in various ways such as the addition of rubber rings.

.
.

In the case of the United States Supreme Court, 94 U.S. 92 (1876), CONSOLIDATED FRUIT-JAR COMPANY  v.  WRIGHT, the Court ruled that Mason's patent had been abandoned to the public.

References

External links
MANUFACTURE OF FRICTION-MATCHES. U.S. Patent 68 at www.todayinsci.com Text of 1858 patent
Biography at National Inventors Hall of Fame

1832 births
1902 deaths
19th-century American inventors
People from New York City
People from Vineland, New Jersey